Vilde Ingstad (born 18 December 1994) is a Norwegian handball player for Team Esbjerg and the Norwegian national team.

She made her debut on the Norwegian national team in 2014.

She also represented Norway in the 2013 Women's Junior European Handball Championship, placing 4th, and in the 2014 Women's Junior World Handball Championship, placing 9th.

Achievements
European Championship:
Winner: 2016, 2022
World Championship:
Winner: 2015, 2021
Silver Medalist: 2017
World Youth Championship:
Bronze Medalist: 2012
EHF Cup:
Finalist: 2019
Danish League:
Gold Medalist: 2019, 2020
Danish Cup:
Winner: 2017
Bronze Medalist: 2018

Individual awards
 All-Star Line Player of Grundigligaen: 2014/2015
 All-Star Line Player of Damehåndboldligaen: 2018/2019
  Best Player of Damehåndboldligaen: 2018/2019

References

1994 births
Living people
Handball players from Oslo
Norwegian female handball players
Norwegian expatriate sportspeople in Denmark
Expatriate handball players
21st-century Norwegian women